The rusty-backed monjita (Neoxolmis rubetra) is a species of bird in the family Tyrannidae.
It is endemic to Argentina. Its natural habitats are subtropical or tropical dry shrubland and pastureland.

Taxonomy
This species was formerly placed in the genus Xolmis. Following the publication of a molecular phylogenetic study in 2020, it was one of three species moved to Neoxolmis.

References

Neoxolmis
Birds of Argentina
Endemic birds of Argentina
Birds described in 1860
Taxonomy articles created by Polbot
Taxa named by Hermann Burmeister
Taxobox binomials not recognized by IUCN